La Presse Porto-Novienne ('Porto-Novo Press') was a French language weekly republican socialist newspaper published from Porto-Novo, Dahomey (present-day Benin). The newspaper was founded in 1931 by Vincent Moreira Pinto. It carried subtitles in Yoruba language, and had a Yoruba language section (one of very few newspapers at the time to include material in an African language).

La Presse Porto-Novienne had an edgy, militant evocation of journalism. It was denied government subsidies, as it was branded as 'extremist'.

See also

List of newspapers in Benin

References

French-language newspapers published in Africa
Newspapers published in Benin
1931 establishments in French Dahomey
Publications established in 1931
Publications with year of disestablishment missing